James Earl "J.D." Williams (born March 30, 1967) is an American football coach and former cornerback who is currently cornerbacks coach at Fresno State. He played college football at Fresno State and was selected by the Buffalo Bills in the first round of the 1990 NFL Draft. Williams played in six NFL seasons, from 1990 to 1994 and 1996 for the Bills, Arizona Cardinals, and San Francisco 49ers.

Williams was most notable for being the first player on the Buffalo Bills squad to don number 31, which had been "retired" to represent the spirit of the franchise. Since Williams wore the number, the Bills have allowed anyone to wear the 31 jersey; it was later worn by Dwayne Wright, who like Williams, went to Fresno State. Jairus Byrd wore the number before becoming a free agent; he used it because his college number, 32, was unofficially retired because of O. J. Simpson.

After retiring from football, Williams became a football coach beginning in 1997 as a graduate assistant at Fresno State.

References

External links
 

1967 births
Living people
American football cornerbacks
Arizona Cardinals players
Buffalo Bills players
Cal Poly Mustangs football coaches
California Golden Bears football coaches
Coaches of American football from Arkansas
Coaches of American football from California
Fresno State Bulldogs football coaches
Fresno State Bulldogs football players
Georgia State Panthers football coaches
People from Coalinga, California
People from Osceola, Arkansas
Players of American football from Arkansas
Players of American football from California
San Francisco 49ers players
San Jose State Spartans football coaches
Sportspeople from Fresno County, California
UNLV Rebels football coaches
Utah Utes football coaches
Washington Huskies football coaches